Karen B. Strier is a primatologist. She is a Vilas Research Professor and Irven DeVore professor of Anthropology at the University of Wisconsin–Madison, and co-editor of Annual Review of Anthropology. The main subject of her research is the Northern Muriqui, a type of spider monkey found in Brazil.

Education 
Strier graduated from Swarthmore College in 1980 with a specially created major in Sociology/Anthropology and Biology. She went to Harvard University for graduate study in anthropology, earning a master's degree there in 1981 and completing her doctorate in 1986.

Career and research 
After continuing at Harvard as a lecturer for a year, she took a faculty position at Beloit College. She moved to the University of Wisconsin in 1989, where she was Hilldale Professor from 2006 to 2011, DeVore Professor since 2009, and Vilas Professor since 2011.

Since 1982, Strier has conducted ongoing research with primates of eastern Brazil. Her work focuses on the Northern Muriqui, with the intention of finding cross-species trends in behavior and population viability as individual primate species' territory in the region has come to shrink and overlap. Her research conducted in the field was some of the first of its kind to focus on New World monkeys, and her 1999 book Primate Behavioral Ecology is still considered the authoritative text on the subject. Strier's Brazilian lab has recently reported increased ground-level activity among the Muriqui.

Strier has edited Primate Ethnographies (Routledge, 2014).

In additional to her research, advocates for conservation of primate habitats on behalf of Conservation International. She has served a role in making ecological education and preservation a greater priority of Brazil's government and international conservation efforts.

Awards and honors

 Fellow of the American Anthropological Association (1991)
 Fellow of the American Association for the Advancement of Science (2003) 
 Elected a member of the National Academy of Sciences (2005)
 Received the American Society of Primatologists' first annual Distinguished Primatologist Award (2010) 
 Elected as president of the International Primatological Society (2016)

Books written

Primate Behavioral Ecology (Allyn and Bacon, 1999; 5th ed., Routledge, 2016)
Faces in the Forest: The Endangered Muriqui Monkeys of Brazil (Oxford University Press, 1992)

References

External links
Home page

Year of birth missing (living people)
Living people
Primatologists
Women primatologists
Swarthmore College alumni
Harvard University alumni
Harvard University faculty
Beloit College faculty
University of Wisconsin–Madison faculty
Fellows of the American Association for the Advancement of Science
Members of the United States National Academy of Sciences
Annual Reviews (publisher) editors